The LIGNA (ligna lat. = the woods), previously known as Ligna Plus (Ligna+) is an industrial trade fair for the woodworking industry. It takes place in uneven years on the Hanover fairground. It is run by Deutsche Messe AG and the  Fachverband Holzbearbeitungsmaschinen section of VDMA e.V.

History 
Until 1975, the Ligna was part of the yearly Hannover Messe. Due to space constraints, it was decided to establish the woodworking section as a separate fair. Since then, the Ligna fair takes place biannually.

Exhibitions 
There are exhibitions of machines and tools from the following sections:
 Forestry and forest technology
 Sawmill technology
 Solid wood treatment
 Furnishing
 Carpentry companies
 Furniture industry
 Bio energy from wood
 Special presentations

Facts and figures 
 Ligna Plus 2001
 Visitors: 114,169
 Exhibitors: 1,933
 Space: 145,083 m²

 Ligna Plus 2003
 Visitors: 98,267
 Exhibitors: 1,720
 Space: 132,355 m²

 Ligna Plus 2005
 Visitors: 96,675
 Exhibitors: 1,800
 Space: 129,083 m²

 Ligna Plus 2007
 Visitors: 107,000
 Exhibitors: 1,879
 Space: 134,583 m²

 Ligna Plus 2009
 Visitors: 83,000
 Exhibitors: 1,758 from 50 countries
 Space: 130,152 m²

 LIGNA 2011
 Visitors: 90,000
 Exhibitors: 1,765 from 52 countries
 Space: 130,000 m²

 LIGNA 2013
 Visitors: 90,000
 Exhibitors: 1,637 from 46 countries
 Space: 124,000 m²

External links 
 ligna.de – Ligna website

Trade fairs in Germany
Recurring events established in 1975
Hanover
Woodworking